Thomas Boston Gordon (February 4, 1816 – January 25, 1891) was born in Hartwell, Georgia and made a career as a lawyer and county judge for Bath County, Kentucky.

Biography

Gordon was one of the eight founding members of the Beta Theta Pi national fraternity at Miami University on August 8, 1839 and received his A.B. degree from Miami in 1840. From 1841-42, Principal of Academy, Deacatur, Georgia. Admitted to the bar, 1842. Judge of Bath County, Kentucky, 1854-58.

During the American Civil War he was a Captain in the Confederate States Army, serving in the Orphan Brigade. Gordon served with Company C, 5th Kentucky Infantry, but afterward transferred to a command of cavalry.

He died in Fayette County, Kentucky and is buried in the Lexington Cemetery.

See also
List of Beta Theta Pi members

Notes

External links

Sources
 Brown, James T., ed., Catalogue of Beta Theta Pi, New York: 1917.

Miami University alumni
1816 births
1891 deaths
Beta Theta Pi founders
People from Hartwell, Georgia